Joseph Amoah (born 26 June 1994) is a Ghanaian football player who plays for Portuguese club Vitória S.C. B.

Club career
He made his professional debut in the Segunda Liga for Vitória Guimarães B on 1 March 2015 in a game against Santa Clara.

He made his Primeira Liga debut for Vitória Guimarães on 23 May 2015 coming in as a second-half substitute for compatriot and fellow Fetteh Feyenoord product Bernard Mensah in a 4–2 victory over Académica de Coimbra.

References

1994 births
Footballers from Accra
Living people
Ghanaian footballers
Association football midfielders
Vitória S.C. B players
Vitória S.C. players
Liga Portugal 2 players
Primeira Liga players
Ghanaian expatriate footballers
Expatriate footballers in Portugal
Ghanaian expatriate sportspeople in Portugal